Greensborough railway station is located on the Hurstbridge line in Victoria, Australia. It serves the north-eastern Melbourne suburb of Greensborough, and it opened on 5 June 1902.

Because of the curvature of the line, northbound (Hurstbridge) bound services head south-east upon departing the station and, likewise, southbound (Flinders Street) bound services head north-west.

After the station, Hurstbridge bound, the double track becomes single for the remainder of the line. A number of peak-hour services to and from Flinders Street terminate at Greensborough.

History

Greensborough station was a single track, single platform station built in 1902, for service to (at the time) the outer north eastern suburb of Greensborough. At the time of construction, it was serviced by steam engines inbound and outbound from the Melbourne CBD, until the completion of the electrification from Heidelberg to Eltham in 1923.

The original platform was located on the south western side of the current platforms where the current car parking is located. The original track ran through the current island platform.

Due to the restrictions of only having one track out to Hurstbridge and only one through track, the trains were timetabled to arrive 3–4 minutes apart. The Hurstbridge service would collect passengers from the platform, then shunt out to a junction at the Up end of the station, pull into a side track and wait 1–2 minutes for the Flinders Street service to arrive then depart, then continuing to Hurstbridge. Due to a much higher passenger count going to the city at the time, the Flinders Street service was given priority over the low passenger count toward Hurstbridge.

In the late 1960s and early 1970s, the station was upgraded to two tracks, and a single offset island platform was built. The station had a platform on the left and right, one for each direction. In 1969, the rebuilt station was provided, and on 3 April 1970, it officially opened. In 1977, a goods yard that existed at the station was closed to traffic. In 1979, the railway line between Greensborough and Macleod was duplicated.

The timetabling for services, however, have remained practically the same, due to the single track which still remains between Greensborough and Hurstbridge, with only crossing loops at Eltham and Diamond Creek. An Eltham/Hurstbridge service arrives approximately one minute before the Flinders Street service arrives, with both services departing at same time, allowing the outbound service clear passage to Eltham.

On 21 June 1996, Greensborough was upgraded to a Premium Station.

In May 2019, the Victorian State Government announced a plan to duplicate the line between Greensborough and Eltham, which will include an upgrading of the station. The upgrade will see a new overpass and concourse built, rebuilt station platforms and better accessibility in and around the station precinct. Works began in early 2020.

Platforms and services

Greensborough has one island platform with two faces. The direction of trains passing each other is unusual for Melbourne, with trains passing on the left, instead of the usual right. During peak periods, both platforms are used by trains travelling in either direction.

It is serviced by Metro Trains' Hurstbridge line services.

Platform 1:
  all stations and limited express services to Flinders Street
  all stations services to Eltham and Hurstbridge (peak-hour only)

Platform 2:
  all stations and limited express services to Flinders Street (peak-hour only)
  all stations services to Eltham and Hurstbridge

Transport links

Dysons operates five routes via Greensborough station, under contract to Public Transport Victoria:
 : Whittlesea – Greensborough Plaza
 : Eltham station – Glenroy station
 : Northland Shopping Centre – St Helena
 : Greensborough Plaza – St Helena West
 : Lalor – Northland Shopping Centre

Kinetic Melbourne operates three routes via Greensborough station, under contract to Public Transport Victoria:
 : Box Hill station – Greensborough
  : Frankston station – Melbourne Airport
  : Chelsea station – Airport West

Panorama Coaches operates one route to and from Greensborough station, under contract to Public Transport Victoria:
 : to Hurstbridge station

Gallery

References

External links

 Melway map at street-directory.com.au

Premium Melbourne railway stations
Railway stations in Melbourne
Railway stations in Australia opened in 1902
Railway stations in the City of Banyule